The MV Karadeniz Powership Rauf Bey is a Liberia-flagged Powership, a floating power plant, owned and operated by Karpowership. Built in 1982 in Brazil and christened MV Gulf Grain, she sailed as a bulk carrier under various names and flags until she was acquired to be converted 2009 into a Powership in Turkey. She served in Basra, Iraq supplying electricity to the power grid there. Currently, she supplies electricity to Sudan.

Cargo ship
She was built by the Ishibras Shipyard of Verolme Estaleiros Reunidos do Brasil at Angra dos Reis, Brazil as a bulk carrier in November 1982.

She saw service under the names Gulf Grain, El Pampero and Agios Raphael before she was sold in June 2009 to Karpowership.

Powership
The originally bulk carrier was converted into a Powership and renamed Karadeniz Powership Rauf Bey. The vessel is registered under the Liberian flag with homeport Monrovia.

In August 2010, the Powership with 179 MW generation power set sail to Basra, Iraq to bridge electricity shortage for about one million people in and around Az Zubayr. At that time, she was considered as the "biggest Powership of the world".

In April 2018, Karpowership signed a contract with Sudanese Thermal Power Generating Company (STPGC) to supply 150 MW to Sudan for 12 months.

Ship's registry
 ex-MV Gulf Grain until July 1991,
 ex-MV El Pampero owned by Navemar S.A. of Argentina and registered in the Bahamas with homeport Nassau until July 2001,
 ex-MV Agios Raphael owned in Cyprus and registered in Panama until June 2009.

References

External links

1982 ships
Bulk carriers
Ships built in Brazil
Ships of Liberia
Rauf Bey
Electric power infrastructure in Iraq